Eternamente enamorados is the second compilation album of the Christian music duet Tercer Cielo, released digitally on March 12 of 2012 and in physical format on June 26 of the same year. It is a compilation of all their romantic songs from "Llueve" (2007), "Hollywood" (2008), "Gente común, sueños extraordinarios" (2009) and "Viaje a las estrellas" (2011) and with an unpublished song: "Ser tu héroe" which was included afterwards in their album "Lo que el viento me enseñó" (Spanish for "What the wind taught me") (2012). The album reached the 6th position for the groups sales in iTunes and the song "Desde el principio" originally from the album "Llueve" went up to the second position of the most sold songs of the group second to "Yo te extrañaré".

Track listing

Credits and personnel 
 Juan Carlos Rodríguez: Producer, composer, mix, recording, piano, guitar, voice
 Evelyn Herrera: executive Producer, voice.
 José "Fono" García: Producer, recording

References 

2012 greatest hits albums
Tercer Cielo compilation albums